Setia is a genus of minute sea snails, marine gastropod mollusks or micromollusks in the family Rissoidae.

Species
Species within the genus Setia include:

 Setia alaskana (Bartsch, 1912)
 Setia alboranensis Peñas & Rolán, 2006
 Setia amabilis (Locard, 1886)
 Setia ambigua (Brugnone, 1873)
 Setia anselmoi (van Aartsen & Engl, 1999)
 Setia antipolitana (van der Linden & Wagner, 1987)
 Setia bruggeni (Verduin, 1984)
 Setia conoidea Seguenza, 1903
 Setia fusca (Philippi, 1841)
 Setia gittenbergeri (Verduin, 1984)
 Setia globosa Seguenza, 1879 
 Setia homerica Romani & Scuderi, 2015
 Setia impolite Rolán & Hernández, 2006
 Setia incognita Perugia, 2021
 Setia jansseni (Verduin, 1984)
 Setia lacourti (Verduin, 1984)
 Setia latior (Mighels & Adams, 1842)
 Setia levantina Bogi & Galil, 2007
 Setia limpida Monterosato, 1884
 Setia miae Verduin, 1988
 Setia microbia Hoenselaar & Hoenselaar, 1991
 Setia nicoleae Segers, Swinnen & De Prins, 2009
 Setia nomeae Moolenbeek & Piersma, 1990
 † Setia occidentalis Le Renard, 1990 
 Setia pulcherrima (Jeffreys, 1848)
 Setia scillae (Aradas & Benoit, 1876)
 Setia sciutiana (Aradas & Benoit, 1874)
 Setia slikorum (Verduin, 1984)
 Setia subvaricosa Gofas, 1990<
 Setia triangularis (Watson, 1886)
 Setia tricincta A. Adams, 1861
 Setia turriculata Monterosato, 1884
 Setia valvatoides (Milaschewitsch, 1909)

Species brought into synonymy
 Setia aartseni (Verduin, 1984): synonym of Crisilla aartseni (Verduin, 1984)
 Setia alexandrae Ávila & Cordeiro, 2015: synonym of Rissoella alexandrae (S. P. Ávila & Cordeiro, 2015)
 Setia atropurpurea Frauenfeld, 1867 accepted as Eatoniella atropurpurea (Frauenfeld, 1867) (original combination)
 Setia beniamina (Monterosato, 1884): synonym of Crisilla beniamina (Monterosato, 1884)
 Setia bifasciata A. Adams, 1861 accepted as Putilla bifasciata (A. Adams, 1861) (original combination)
 Setia candida A. Adams, 1861: synonym of Charisma candida (A. Adams, 1861)
 Setia depicta (Manzoni, 1868): synonym of Crisilla depicta (Manzoni, 1868)
 Setia ermelindoi Ávila & Cordeiro, 2015: synonym of Rissoella ermelindoi (S. P. Ávila & Cordeiro, 2015)
 Setia gianninii F. Nordsieck, 1974: synonym of Onoba gianninii (F. Nordsieck, 1974)
 Setia inflata Monterosato, 1884: synonym of Setia fusca (Philippi, 1841)
 Setia innominata (Verduin, 1988): synonym of Crisilla innominata (R. B. Watson, 1897)
 Setia kuiperi (Verduin, 1984): synonym of Setia limpida Monterosato, 1884
 Setia lidyae Verduin, 1988: synonym of Crisilla iunoniae (Palazzi, 1988)
 Setia macilenta Monterosato, 1880: synonym of Obtusella macilenta (Monterosato, 1880)
 Setia maculata (Monterosato, 1869): synonym of Crisilla maculata (Monterosato, 1869)
 Setia marmorata (Cantraine, 1842): synonym of Crisilla semistriata (Montagu, 1808)
 Setia netoae Ávila & Cordeiro, 2015: synonym of Rissoella netoae (S. P. Ávila & Cordeiro, 2015)
 Setia nitens Frauenfeld, 1867 accepted as Lucidestea nitens (Frauenfeld, 1867) (original combination)
 Setia ochroleuca Brusina, 1869: synonym of Eatonina ochroleuca (Brusina, 1869)
 Setia pallaryi Hornung & Mermod, 1927 accepted as Lucidestea pallaryi (Hornung & Mermod, 1927) (original combination)
 Setia perminima (Manzoni, 1868): synonym of Crisilla perminima (Manzoni, 1868)
 Setia pumila Monterosato, 1884: synonym of Eatonina pumila (Monterosato, 1884)
 Setia quisquiliarum (Watson, 1886): synonym of Crisilla quisquiliarum (R. B. Watson, 1886)
 Setia roseotincta Dautzenberg, 1889: synonym of Obtusella roseotincta (Dautzenberg, 1889)
 Setia soluta (Philippi, 1844): synonym of Setia fusca (Philippi, 1841)
 Setia subsulcata (Philippi, 1844): synonym of Crisilla semistriata (Montagu, 1808)
 Setia tenuisculpta (R.B. Watson, 1873): synonym of Talassia tenuisculpta (R. B. Watson, 1873)
 Setia tiberiana (Issel, 1869): synonym of Voorwindia tiberiana (Issel, 1869)
 Setia translucida Nordsieck, 1972: synonym of Rissoella diaphana (Alder, 1848)
 Setia tumidula G.O. Sars, 1878: synonym of Obtusella tumidula (Sars G. O., 1878)
 Setia turgida (Jeffreys, 1870): synonym of Pseudosetia turgida (Jeffreys, 1870)
 Setia ugesae Verduin, 1988: synonym of Crisilla ugesae (Verduin, 1988)

References

 Nordsieck, F. (1972). Die europäischen Meeresschnecken (Opisthobranchia mit Pyramidellidae; Rissoacea). Vom Eismeer bis Kapverden, Mittelmeer und Schwarzes Meer. Gustav Fischer, Stuttgart. XIII + 327 pp.
 Gofas, S.; Le Renard, J.; Bouchet, P. (2001). Mollusca. in: Costello, M.J. et al. (Ed.) (2001). European register of marine species: a check-list of the marine species in Europe and a bibliography of guides to their identification. Collection Patrimoines Naturels. 50: pp. 180–213

External links
 Adams, H. & Adams, A. (1852). On a new arrangement of British Rissoae. Annals and Magazine of Natural History. (2) 10: 358-359
 Monterosato, T. A. di. (1884). Nomenclatura generica e specifica di alcune conchiglie mediterranee. Virzi, printed for the author, Palermo, 152 pp

Rissoidae
Gastropod genera